Death on the Diamond is a 1934 comedy-mystery film starring Robert Young. It was based on the novel Death on the Diamond: A Baseball Mystery Story by Cortland Fitzsimmons, directed by Edward Sedgwick and produced and released by Metro-Goldwyn-Mayer.

Synopsis
Unless his team can win the pennant, owner Pop Clark (David Landau) will lose his baseball team, the St. Louis Cardinals. He gets Larry Kelly (Robert Young) in order to try and seal the deal. However, rival teams and mobsters are trying to stop his team from winning the pennant race, with some of his star players getting killed on and off the field.

Production
Appearing uncredited in the film were a number of ex-Major Leaguers, including Bob and Irish Meusel, Ping Bodie, Ivan Olson and Pat Flaherty, plus one player who was still very much active, slugger Wally "Red" Berger.

Reception
Leonard Maltin described the film as an "absurd crime tale" while giving it 2 out of 4 stars.

Cast
Robert Young as Larry Kelly
Madge Evans as Frances Clark
Nat Pendleton as Larry "Truck" Hogan
Ted Healy as Terry "Crawfish" O'Toole
C. Henry Gordon as Joseph Karnes
Paul Kelly as Jimmie Downey
David Landau as Pop Clark
DeWitt Jennings as Mr. Patterson
Edward Brophy as Police Sgt. Grogan
Willard Robertson as Police Lt. Luke Cato
Mickey Rooney as Mickey
Robert Livingston as Frank "Higgie" Higgins
Joe Sawyer as Duncan "Dunk" Spencer (as Joe Sauers)

References

External links
 
 
 

1934 films
1930s crime films
1930s mystery films
1930s sports films
American crime films
American mystery films
American baseball films
American black-and-white films
Comedy mystery films
1930s English-language films
Films based on American novels
Films directed by Edward Sedgwick
Films based on mystery novels
Metro-Goldwyn-Mayer films
St. Louis Cardinals
1930s American films